is a horizontally scrolling shooter released in arcades by UPL in 1988. In the US, the game was published by Nikom. The PC Engine version is an adaptation of the arcade original and published as Atomic Robo-Kid Special.

Plot
In the 21st century, a blast of cosmic radiation bombarded Terra-12, a deep-space outpost of Earth, hideously mutating all transplanted life. A fleet of savage beings followed the radiation wave and invaded the planet and began the systematic destruction of all remaining sentient life. Years of battling the alien 'governors' have gone by, and now only one hope survives to avenge the desperate terran colonists.

Gameplay

The player controls the titular character through six stages of increasing difficulty, facing an alien "governor" boss (which is so large as to be considered a level in and of themself, as some of the bosses take up several screens) at the end of each level, followed by a "duel" level against other Robo-Kid sized robots.  Many levels branch into others, giving the player the choice over which zone to enter next, increasing replayability.

Robo-Kid can collect four different weapons (whichever weapon is selected is lost when Robo-kid loses a life) in addition to his default gun, collect powerups for a shield that activates on enemy contact, plus rapid fire and speed powerups. The player can also encounter a friendly dinosaur-looking robot that sells weapons and shields to Robo-kid using extra lives as currency.

Ports
The game was ported to the PC Engine, Sega Genesis, Commodore 64, Atari ST, Amiga, and X68000.

A demo was distributed of the ZX Spectrum version  before it was cancelled.

Reception 
In Japan, Game Machine listed Atomic Robo-Kid on their March 1, 1989 issue as being the eighth most-successful table arcade unit of the month.

Legacy
The game was released on the Nintendo Switch in the Nintendo eShop on 15 November 2018 by Hamster Corporation (its current rights owner) as part of their Arcade Archives series.

References

External links 

Atomic Robo-Kid at Arcade History
Atomic Robo-Kid at Atari Mania

1988 video games
Amiga games
Arcade video games
Atari ST games
Commodore 64 games
Horizontally scrolling shooters
Nintendo Switch games
PlayStation 4 games
Sega Genesis games
X68000 games
TurboGrafx-16 games
Cancelled ZX Spectrum games
UPL Co., Ltd games
Video games developed in Japan
Hamster Corporation games
Multiplayer and single-player video games